The 2017 Women's Football at the 2017 Pacific Mini Games is the 1st edition of the international football tournament organized by the Oceania Football Confederation (OFC) for players who are playing in the Pacific Region.

Venues

Participating teams

Four teams participated in the tournament.

Squads

Officials

Group stage

Bronze Medal

Gold Medal

Goalscorers

References

Football at the 2017 Pacific Mini Games